Štěpán Vojtěch (born 23 April 1977) is a Czech rally driver. He used to race in the PWRC in the 2006 and 2007 season.

Complete WRC results

PWRC results

Czech Rally Championship results

External links
 eWRC-results.com profile

1977 births
Place of birth missing (living people)
Czech rally drivers
Living people
World Rally Championship drivers
ADAC GT Masters drivers